The 2004–05 UEFA Futsal Cup was the 19th edition of Europe's premier club futsal tournament and the 4th edition under the current UEFA Futsal Cup format.

Preliminary round

First qualifying round

Group 1

Group 2

Group 3

Group 4

Group 5

Group 6

Group 7

Group 8

Second qualifying round

Group A

Group B

Final

The 2005 UEFA Futsal Cup Final was played on April 23, 2005 at the Spiroudôme in Charleroi, Belgium and April 30, 2005 at the Sport Hall "Druzhba"  in Moscow, Russia. Action 21 won 10–9 on aggregate.

Top goalscorers

External links
 uefa.com

UEFA Futsal Champions League
Cup